Ashangba Nongjabi (English: Crimson Rainclouds) is a 2003 Indian Meitei language film written by M. K. Binodini Devi. It is produced and directed by Aribam Syam Sharma. Bhogen, Lingjelthoibi and Ningthoujam Rina played lead roles in the movie. The movie is based on M. K. Binodini Devi's 1966 play of the same title. The play draws on the playwright’s interactions with Ramkinkar Baij, the eminent sculptor, with whom she studied in Santiniketan, and who has left behind a whole suite of sculptures and paintings of Binodini.

Synopsis
Gautam, an artist, determined to uphold his freedom, is torn between his two loves, both only too gentle in their demands, and yet deeply caring. A sensitive man, he chooses art, knowing full well that he lets them down. While Indu would like him to change his lifestyle just a little bit, for recognition and comfort, Keinatombi would be happy to give him the little care and comfort that she thinks he needs for his art. For the time being at least, Gautam would go with her.

Cast
 Bhogen as Gautam
 Lingjelthoibi as Indu
 Ningthoujam Rina as Keinatombi
 Kangabam Tomba as Indu's Uncle
 Huirem Manglem as Gautam's customer

Books
In 1967, a collection of three plays by M. K. Binodini Devi under the title Ashangba Nongjabi was published. A book on the English translation of the play named as Crimson Rainclouds by L. Somi Roy, the writer's son, was also published.

References

2003 films
Films directed by Aribam Syam Sharma
Meitei-language films